The Brateș is a left tributary of the river Tarcău in Romania. It discharges into the Tarcău near the village Brateș.

References

Rivers of Romania
Rivers of Neamț County